"Bloodline" (stylized in all lowercase) is a song by American singer Ariana Grande from her fifth studio album, Thank U, Next (2019) through Republic Records. It was written by Ariana Grande, Savan Kotecha, and its producers Max Martin and Ilya Salmanzadeh.

Commercially, "Bloodline" reached the top 10 in Greece and Hungary, as well as top 20 in Australia, Canada, Portugal, Singapore and Slovakia. It peaked at number 22 in the United States.

Background
"Bloodline" was first confirmed to be a part of the track listing via Instagram on January 22, 2019. On January 23, 2019, Grande said that the song is about "wanting somebody but not enough to have them in your bloodline".

The record features a sound bite from Marjorie Grande, Grande's grandmother, in which she is talking about a hearing aid. However, Grande cut it down so it sounds like she is talking about sex. Grande also stated that she used this sound bite because her grandmother is the "matriarch of the bloodline".

Composition and lyrics

"Bloodline" was written by Ariana Grande, Savan Kotecha, and its producers Max Martin and Ilya Salmanzadeh. Grande's vocals were recorded by at the MXM Studios in Los Angeles and Wolf Cousins Studios in Stockholm. It has been compared to Grande's 2016 single "Side to Side" from Grande's third studio album Dangerous Woman (2016).

Critical reception
The song received favorable reviews from the music critics. Michael Cragg of The Guardian stated that the song "posits the idea that maybe it’s best to just see how things go relationship-wise and getting engaged after a few months isn’t essential", believing that this song is about Pete Davidson, Grande's ex-fiance. Tegwyn Hughes of The Queen's Journal says that along with fellow album tracks "bad idea" and "make up," the song "leave[s] behind notions of romance in favour of sexuality and fun without attachment."

Commercial performance
"Bloodline" debuted at number 22 on the US Billboard Hot 100 chart issue dated February 23, 2019, earning Grande her 21st top-30 entry in the nation, as well as becoming her 4th highest-charting non-single after "Needy", "NASA" and "Imagine" which also appear on the parent album.

In Australia, "Bloodline" debuted at number 11, surpassing the three aforementioned songs above. It consequently became Grande's highest position for a non-single and her 19th top-twenty hit in the country In Canada, the song debuted at number 18, after "Needy" and "NASA".

In France, "Bloodline" debuted at number 97 being the highest-charting song from the album and the only top 100 entry along with "Needy". In Italy, it debuted at number 98, being the only track not released as a single charting there. In Norway, it reached number 24, also being the only track from the album, not released as a single, to chart there.

Live performances
"Bloodline" was performed during all dates during the Sweetener World Tour, from March 18, 2019 to June 29, 2019.

Credits and personnel
Credits adapted from Tidal.
 Ariana Grande – lead vocals, songwriter, vocal producer
 Savan Kotecha – songwriter
 Max Martin – songwriter, producer, programmer, bass, guitar, drums, keyboards
 Ilya Salmanzadeh – songwriter, producer, programmer, bass, guitar, drums, keyboards
 Marjorie "Nonna" Grande – backing vocals
 Wojtek Bylund – alto saxophone
 Mattias Bylund – horn arranger
 Tomas Jonsson – tenor saxophone
 Peter Noos Johansson – trombone
 Janne Bjerger – trumpet
 Magnus Johannson – trumpet
 Serban Ghenea – mixer, studio personnel
 John Hanes – assistant mixer , studio personnel
 Cory Bice – assistant recording engineer, studio personnel
 Jeremy Lertola – assistant recording engineer, studio personnel

Charts

Certifications

References

External links
 

2019 songs
Ariana Grande songs
Song recordings produced by Ilya Salmanzadeh
Song recordings produced by Max Martin
Songs written by Ariana Grande
Songs written by Ilya Salmanzadeh
Songs written by Max Martin
Songs written by Savan Kotecha